Eupithecia latitans is a moth in the  family Geometridae. It is found in Peru.

The wingspan is about 18 mm. The forewings are pale greenish grey, powdered with olive scales. The shadings are olive. The hindwings are similar, but all the markings are less definite.

References

Moths described in 1905
laudabilis
Moths of South America